Harold Anthony "Boat" Hurley (November 16, 1929 – August 29, 2017) was a Canadian ice hockey goaltender who competed in the 1960 Winter Olympics.

Born in Stratford, Ontario, he won the silver medal at the 1960 Winter Olympics in ice hockey. He played for such teams as the Kitchener-Waterloo Dutchmen, Buffalo Bisons, and Guelph Regals. He played one match in the American Hockey League. In his final season of senior amateur hockey, Hurley was the goaltender for the 1970-71 Galt Hornets--a team that won the Allan Cup.

Hurley was a longtime employee of Bauer Industries Ltd., a company that manufactured padding for automobiles.

Hurley died in Kitchener, Ontario, on August 29, 2017, aged 87.

References

 
 

1929 births
2017 deaths
Buffalo Bisons (AHL) players
Canadian ice hockey goaltenders
Ice hockey players at the 1960 Winter Olympics
Medalists at the 1960 Winter Olympics
Olympic ice hockey players of Canada
Olympic medalists in ice hockey
Olympic silver medalists for Canada
Sportspeople from Stratford, Ontario